Sibylle was a 32-gun copper-hulled, frigate of the French Navy, lead ship of her class.

Career
Sibylle took part in the Battle of Ushant on 27 July 1778, under Kerhouan-Mahé. She was part of the division under Lamotte-Piquet that captured 18 British merchantmen in the action of 2 May 1781.

In 1783, Sibylle was under Captain Kergariou Locmaria. On 2 January, she fought a hotly contested, and ultimately inconclusive Action of 2 January 1783 against HMS Magicienne.

Sibylle effected repairs and returned to the sea, but ended up being captured by the 50-gun HMS Centurion and Hussar in the action of 22 January 1783.

Fate
The British broke up Sibylle in 1784.

Notes, citations, and references 

Notes

Citations

References
 
 

Age of Sail frigates of France
Ships built in France
Sibylle-class frigates
1777 ships
Captured ships